Samsara is the third studio album by Yakuza and their first for Prosthetic Records. Furthering the departure from their debut, which displayed a more stripped-down post-hardcore style, Samsara, like Way of the Dead, is more eclectic and progressive; their experimental metal style assimilating Bruce Lamont's saxophone for a unique sound that some would label "jazzcore." Mastodon's Troy Sanders performs guest vocals on the final track, "Back To The Mountain."

Track listing
"Cancer Industry" – 3:02
"Plecostomus" – 3:38
"Monkeytail" – 5:24
"Transmission Ends... Signal Lost" – 1:27
"Dishonor" – 5:20
"20 Bucks" – 5:02
"Exterminator" – 7:26
"Just Say Know" – 2:58
"Glory Hole" – 6:57
"Back to the Mountain" – 9:02

Personnel
Bruce Lamont - vocals, saxophones, clarinet, effects
Matt McClelland - guitars, vocals
John E. Bohmer - bass
James Staffel - drums, percussion, keyboards

Guest Musicians
Sanford Parker - effects (6)
Jim Baker - piano (9)
Troy Sanders - vocals (10)
Fred Lonberg-Holm - cello

References

2006 albums
Yakuza (band) albums
Prosthetic Records albums